Journey to the Savage Planet is a 2020 adventure game developed by Typhoon Studios and published by 505 Games. It was released for Microsoft Windows, PlayStation 4, and Xbox One on January 28, 2020, followed by a Nintendo Switch port on May 21, 2020, and a Stadia version on February 1, 2021. An upgraded version of the game titled Journey to the Savage Planet: Employee of the Month Edition for PlayStation 5 and Xbox Series X/S was released on February 14, 2023.

Gameplay
Journey to the Savage Planet is an adventure game played from a first-person perspective. In the game, players are tasked to explore ARY-26, a colorful planet inhabited by various alien lifeforms such as Pufferbird, Barfer, and Floopsnoot. The player's main task is to catalogue various alien flora and fauna, and collect the resources needed to craft new items and upgrades, such as jetpacks and grappling hooks, which enable the players to reach previously inaccessible areas. Players will encounter various hostile lifeforms, which can be defeated using weapons such as laser guns and throwable items such as acid grenades. The game can be played cooperatively with another player.

Plot
As an employee of Kindred Aerospace, the "4th Best Interstellar Exploration Company", the player must explore an uncharted planet named ARY-26 to see if it would be suitable for future human colonization.

Development
Journey to the Savage Planet was directed by Alex Hutchinson, the director of Assassin's Creed III and Far Cry 4, and it was the debut project for Typhoon Studios. About 20-30 people worked on the game, and the game's development started in late 2017. The team wanted to make the game a very focused experience, thus they avoided adding many features that were considered as "extras" in other triple A titles. Elements from Metroidvania games were incorporated into the game, and the team introduced a lot of hidden content to encourage players to explore the world.  In comparison to standard video games the game was designed to be shorter and easier than most modern titles, this was done so that players would not "see it as a liability". Speaking of the game's tone, Hutchinson called the game an "earnest comedy" and that the title was "very much more in the fiction side of science fiction". The game's dialogue was designed to be humorous, but the team ensured that players can create funny moments on purpose or by accident via the title's various interconnected gameplay systems. Metroid Prime, the Far Cry series and Subnautica influenced the game's design, while the game's bright visual style was inspired by films such as Men in Black and Ghostbusters. The game incorporates elements from Pioneer, a cancelled game that Hutchinson was working on at Ubisoft. The team took influence from the Golden Age of Science Fiction specifically the optimism expressed in those works.

Hutchinson announced the game during The Game Awards 2018. Publisher 505 Games released the game on PlayStation 4, Xbox One, and Microsoft Windows (via the Epic Games Store) on January 28, 2020. Due to the relatively light content Hutchinson chose to release the game at a budget price of $30 which he hoped would help players "take a risk with a new IP". A Nintendo Switch port was released on May 21, 2020.

On December 19, 2019, Google acquired Typhoon Studios and placed it under Stadia Games and Entertainment (SG&E), the division developing games exclusively for Stadia, Google's cloud gaming service. The studio was integrated with SG&E's existing Montreal studio, which was headed up by Sébastien Puel. Journey to the Savage Planet was not part of the acquisition. A Stadia version of Journey of the Savage Planet was released by SG&E on February 1, 2021. On the same day, Google shut down SG&E and its internal studios, with all former Typhoon Studios staff leaving the company. Due to these closures, the developers became unable to fix several bugs present in the Stadia version, including hangs and crashes. 505 Games stated that all assets of the Stadia version were owned by Google and SG&E, therefore the publisher could not resolve the situation. Google eventually released a patch on February 23.

Former members of Typhoon Studios established a new studio Raccoon Logic in August 2021, with some funding support from Tencent. Through negotiation, they were able to retain the intellectual property rights to Journey and the planned sequel that Typhoon had been working on at Google.

Reception

Reviews of the game were generally positive according to review aggregator Metacritic,

References

External links
 

2020 video games
Indie video games
Video games about extraterrestrial life
Metroidvania games
Nintendo Switch games
PlayStation 4 games
PlayStation 5 games
Science fiction video games
Video games developed in Canada
Video games set on fictional planets
Windows games
Xbox Cloud Gaming games
Xbox One games
Xbox Series X and Series S games
Multiplayer and single-player video games
505 Games games
Unreal Engine games
Science fiction comedy
Video games set in the future
Stadia games